There are numerous castles in Gloucestershire, a county in South West England. They consist of motte-and-baileys, fortified manor houses, ringwork, and ring-mottes. A motte-and-bailey castle has two elements, the motte is an artificial conical mound with a wooden stockade and stronghold on top, usually a stone keep or tower. A bailey is a defended enclosure below the motte, surrounded by a ditch. Motte-and-bailey castles were the most common type of castle in England following the Norman Conquest. Ringworks are similar to motte-and-baileys although lack the characteristic motte; across England they are an uncommon form of fortification but were popular in the west of Gloucestershire in the 11th century. A ring-motte is a ring-work with a raised centre. A shell keep was a motte with a stone wall rather than a wooden stockade on top; there would have been no tower within the walls.

The first wave of castle building in Gloucestershire occurred after the Norman invasion of 1066, with William FitzOsbern, the Earl of Hereford, given the initial responsibility for occupying Gloucestershire, Herefordshire and probably Worcestershire. FitzOsbern probably built the first castle at Gloucester, and pushed westwards to build the castle at Chepstow; other early castles were built in the Forest of Dean to shield the city of Gloucester from Welsh incursions. Many of these castles were abandoned soon after the conquest as security improved. To the south of Gloucestershire, Bristol Castle formed the next substantial fortification, with another network of castles in Herefordshire providing defence to the north. After the fall of FitzOsbern's son, Walter de Gloucester rose to power in the region, followed by his son, Miles de Gloucester. In the final years before the outbreak of the civil war of the Anarchy, the Gloucesters were extensively developing their primary castle at Gloucester. Gloucester was a key battleground in the conflict from 1139–53 between the rival rulers of Stephen and Empress Matilda. Warfare in England at the time centred on castles and attrition warfare and the largely pro-Angevin supporters of Matilda in Gloucestershire responded with a rush of castle-building. Many of these were destroyed by Stephen during the war, or after the conflict when Henry II attempted to restore royal control over these critical fortifications, although recent scholarship has indicated that less Gloucestershire castles were destroyed in the 1150s than once thought. In the 13th and 14th century, fortified manor houses became a more popular form of fortification. By the 16th century, most Gloucestershire castles were in disuse, although some, such as Gloucester and St Briavels remained in use as administrative centres or gaols. Several castles in Gloucestershire were damaged or slighted in the English Civil War from 1642–9. In the 18th and 19th century, prison reform brought an end to the use of Gloucestershire castles as gaols, leaving only a handful of occupied castles as private homes in the 21st century.

List of castles

References

Bibliography
Amt, Emilie. (1993) The Accession of Henry II in England: royal government restored, 1149-1159. Woodbridge, UK: Boydell Press. .
Bradbury, Jim. (2009) Stephen and Matilda: the Civil War of 1139-53. Stroud, UK: The History Press. .
Clarke, Benjamin. (1852) The British Gazetteer: Political, Commercial, Ecclesiastical, and Historical. London: Collins.
Curnow, P.E. and E.A. Johnson. (1985) "St Briavels Castle," in Chateau Gaillard: études de castellologie médiévale. Caen: Centre de Recherches Archéologiques Médiévales. .
Friar, Stephen. (2003) The Sutton Companion to Castles. Stroud: Sutton Publishing. .
Heighway, Carolyn. (1985) Gloucester: a History and Guide. Gloucester, UK: Alan Sutton. .
King, David James Cathcart. (1988) The Castle in England and Wales: an Interpretive History. Beckenhem, UK: Croom Helm. .
Lindley, E. S. (1954) "Wotton under Edge Notes," in Transactions of the Bristol and Gloucestershire Archaeological Society,  1954, Vol 73.
Pettifer, Adrian. (1995) English Castles: A Guide by Counties. Woodbridge, UK: Boydell Press. .
Pounds, Norman John Greville. (1990) The Medieval Castle in England and Wales: a social and political history. Cambridge: Cambridge University Press. .
Remfry, P.M. Saint Briavels Castle, 1066 to 1331. Worcester, UK: SCS Publishing. .
Renn, Derek Frank. (1968) Norman castles in Britain. London: Baker.
Rowley, Trevor. (1997) Norman England. Batsford and English Heritage. .
Rushford and Knowles. (1931) "Proceedings at the Annual Meeting held at Cirencester," in Transactions of the Bristol and Gloucestershire Archaeological Society, 1931, Vol. 52.
Scott-Garrett, C. "Littledean Camp," in Transactions of the Bristol and Gloucestershire Archaeological Society, 1958, Vol. 77.
Steane, John M. (1985) The Archaeology of Medieval England and Wales, Volume 1985, Part 2. Beckenhem, UK: Croom Helm. .
Thomas, William Heard. (1839) Tinterne and its Vicinity. Bristol: Hamilton and Adams.
Verey, David and Alan Brooks. (2002) Pevsner Architectural Guide, Gloucestershire 2: The Vale and The Forest of Dean. New Haven, US: Yale University Press. .
Walker, David. "Gloucestershire Castles," in Transactions of the Bristol and Gloucestershire Archaeological Society, 1991, Vol. 109.

Further reading
Rawes, Barbara. (1977) "A check list of castles and other fortified sites of medieval date in Gloucestershire," in Glevensis,  1977, Vol 11.

History of Gloucestershire

Castles
Gloucestershire